Pultenaea cuneata is a species of flowering plant in the family Fabaceae and is endemic to eastern Australia. It is an erect shrub with triangular to egg-shaped leaves with the narrower end towards the base, and groups of yellow to orange and red to purple flowers.

Description

Taxonomy and naming
Pultenaea cuneata was first formally described in 1837 by George Bentham in the Commentationes de Leguminosarum Generibus. The specific epithet (cuneata) means "wedge-shaped".

Distribution and habitat
This pultenaea is an understorey shrub in woodland and forest in the Moreton and Darling Downs districts in Queensland and from the Liverpool Range to the Nandewar Range in New South Wales.

References

cuneata
Flora of New South Wales
Flora of Queensland
Plants described in 1837
Taxa named by George Bentham